Joseph Curl is an American writer and political columnist for The Washington Times, where he has published Right Read, a news aggregator, since 2015. From 2010 to 2014, Curl also worked for the Drudge Report, where he worked the morning shift. He now works for The Daily Wire.

References

External links
Joseph Curl at The Washington Times
RightRead.com

American male non-fiction writers
Living people
The Washington Times people
American columnists
American political writers
Year of birth missing (living people)